Igor and the Lunatics is a 1985 horror film directed by Billy Parolini and distributed by Troma Entertainment. The film follows Paul, a maniacal cult leader, and his group of murderous followers, Igor and Bernard, who, after being sent to prison after a killing spree, are released sixteen years later, only to return to their killings.

External links

 

1985 films
1985 horror films
American independent films
Troma Entertainment films
1980s English-language films
1980s American films